Iain James Fraser (born August 10, 1969) is a Canadian former professional ice hockey centre. He was selected by the New York Islanders in the ninth round, 233rd overall, in the 1989 NHL Entry Draft.

Biography
Fraser was born in Scarborough, Ontario. As a youth, he played in the 1982 Quebec International Pee-Wee Hockey Tournament with a minor ice hockey team from Oshawa.

Drafted from the Ontario Hockey League's Oshawa Generals, Fraser played three seasons in the American Hockey League with the Capital District Islanders before being called up to the National Hockey League to play for New York. Fraser only played seven games with the Islanders during the 1992–93 season and became a member of the Quebec Nordiques in 1993–94. He only played one season with the Nordiques; he recorded 17 goals and 20 assists, both career highs. In his NHL career, Fraser played in 94 games. He scored 23 goals and added 23 assists. He also appeared in four games with Winnipeg in the 1996 playoffs, going scoreless.

Fraser made brief appearances with the Dallas Stars (four games), the Edmonton Oilers (nine), the Winnipeg Jets (twelve), and the San Jose Sharks (two) to round out his NHL experience. 

Fraser played four seasons in Germany's Deutsche Eishockey Liga before moving to the Fresno Falcons and also played three games in England for the Sheffield Steelers. He then spent three seasons in Italy, one in Serie A with HC Alleghe and two in Serie A2 with HC Merano. Fraser returned to England in 2006 with the Newcastle Vipers in the Elite Ice Hockey League. He picked up an assist in his debut game against the Cardiff Devils. After six games he left the team and retired.

Career statistics

References

External links

1969 births
Berlin Capitals players
Canadian ice hockey centres
Capital District Islanders players
Dallas Stars players
Denver Grizzlies players
Edmonton Oilers players
Frankfurt Lions players
Fresno Falcons players
HC Alleghe players
HC Merano players
Kansas City Blades players
Kentucky Thoroughblades players
Living people
New York Islanders draft picks
New York Islanders players
Newcastle Vipers players
Oshawa Generals players
Quebec Nordiques players
Richmond Renegades players
San Jose Sharks players
SC Herisau players
Schwenninger Wild Wings players
Sportspeople from Scarborough, Toronto
Ice hockey people from Toronto
Sheffield Steelers players
Springfield Falcons players
Winnipeg Jets (1979–1996) players
Canadian expatriate ice hockey players in England
Canadian expatriate ice hockey players in Italy
Canadian expatriate ice hockey players in Germany
Canadian expatriate ice hockey players in Switzerland
Canadian expatriate ice hockey players in the United States